Wanna Go Back is the eleventh and final studio album by American singer Eddie Money, released in 2007. On it, Money sings cover versions of popular songs from the 1960s. His daughter, Jesse Money, performed on three tracks from the album. The title comes from Money's 1986 hit "I Wanna Go Back".

It was his last album to be released before his death on September 13, 2019.

Track listing
"Ain't No Mountain High Enough" (featuring Jesse Money) (Nikolas Ashford, Valerie Simpson) - 2:41
"Higher and Higher" (Gary Jackson, Carl Smith, Raynard Miner) - 3:24
"You Don't Know Me" (Eddy Arnold, Cindy Walker, Andy Walker) - 4:42
"Baby, Now That I've Found You" (John MacLeod, Tony Macaulay) - 3:02
"Good Lovin'" (Rudy Clark, Artie Resnick) - 2:36
"Expressway to Your Heart" (Kenny Gamble, Leon Huff) - 3:34
"Jenny Take a Ride" (Enotris Johnson, Richard Penniman) - 4:04
"Build Me Up Buttercup" (Michael d'Abo, Macaulay) - 3:35
"Land of a Thousand Dances" (Chris Kenner) - 3:30
"Hold On, I'm Comin'" (featuring Jesse Money) (Isaac Hayes, David Porter) - 2:27
"Mockingbird" (featuring Jesse Money) (Charlie Foxx, Inez Foxx) - 4:24
"Please Please/Baby Don't You Weep" (Johnny Terry, James Brown) - 5:46

Personnel
Eddie Money - Vocals, Harmonica
Randy Forrester - Keyboards, Back Up Vocals
Joel Jaffe - Lead Guitar
Robert Zuckerman - Clarinet, Saxophone
Jeff Tamelier - Rhythm Guitar
Tommy Miller - Bass Guitar, Back Up Vocals
Jesse Money - Back Up Vocals

Production

Producer - Eddie Money
Producer, Mastering - Joel Jaffe 
Executive Producer - Randy Forrester
Executive Producer - Jim Ervin
Executive Producer - Rande Volpert
Assistant Engineer - Jeremy Phillips
Cover Photo - Bill Shepard
Engineer - Marc Dimmitt

References

2007 albums
Eddie Money albums
Covers albums